Chan Yuk Keung (also known as Kurt) (陳育強) (1959-) is a Hong Kong artist.

Chan Yuk Keung  was born in 1959. He graduated from the Department of Fine Arts of the Chinese University of Hong Kong in 1983. Later he completed his Master of Fine Art in painting at the Cranbrook Academy of Art, Michigan, United States. 

Chan started teaching in the Department of Fine Arts at Chinese University, lecturing on Western media design. He was the course leader of the Master of Fine Arts program there.

Chan has participated in over 80 exhibitions, including the 51st Venice Biennial and 2nd Asia Pacific Triennial. His research interests are Hong Kong's local art, mixed media art and public art. He was the editor of the Hong Kong Visual Arts Yearbook since 2000, the art governor of City Art Square and also the advisor of the Asia Art Archive.

Achievements
 First Prize of Public Art Scheme Competition (Tai Po Central Town Square) (1999)
 Second Prize of NORD/LB Art for Expo Competition (1999)
 Finalist for the Sculpture Competition for the Hong Kong Central Library (2000)

The Department of Fine Arts of the Chinese University of Hong Kong, Hong Kong Tramways, and advertising company POAD launched Phase 3 of ARTram Shelters. Chan worked on urban-inspired artworks that were displayed at tram shelters in Causeway Bay and Wan Chai.

In addition to providing tram shelters as street-level exhibition stage, Phase 3 further supports emerging artists via a mentorship arrangement with Chan Yuk Keung

Research publications

References 

1959 births
Chinese University of Hong Kong people
Living people